Seán Goulding (1877 – 15 December 1959) was an Irish Fianna Fáil politician. A company director, he was a Teachta Dála (TD) from 1927 to 1937, then a senator from 1938 to 1954, serving as Cathaoirleach of Seanad Éireann from 1943 to 1948.

From County Waterford, Goulding was elected at the September 1927 general election to the 6th Dáil as a TD for the Waterford constituency. He was re-elected at two further general elections until his defeat at the 1937 election to the 9th Dáil. He stood again at the 1938, 1943 and 1944 general elections, but never returned to the Dáil.

After the loss of his Dáil seat in 1937, he stood in the subsequent elections to the 5th Seanad Éireann, winning a seat on the Industrial and Commercial Panel. He was re-elected in 1943, and in 1944 was returned on the Administrative Panel, serving as Cathaoirleach of the Seanad from 1948 to 1951. In 1951, he was nominated by the Taoiseach, Éamon de Valera, to the 7th Seanad, and elected as Leas-Chathaoirleach (deputy chair) on 2 June 1948. He did not contest the 1954 Seanad election. He died on 15 December 1959, aged 82.

References

1877 births
1959 deaths
Fianna Fáil TDs
Cathaoirligh of Seanad Éireann
Members of the 6th Dáil
Members of the 7th Dáil
Members of the 8th Dáil
Members of the 3rd Seanad
Members of the 4th Seanad
Members of the 5th Seanad
Members of the 6th Seanad
Members of the 7th Seanad
Nominated members of Seanad Éireann
Fianna Fáil senators